Dance of the 41 is a Mexican drama film directed by David Pablos, written by Monika Revilla and produced by Pablo Cruz and El Estudio. It portrays the events leading up to and around a 1901 party of gay men, half of whom were dressed in drag, known as the Dance of the Forty-One.

It stars Alfonso Herrera as Ignacio de la Torre y Mier, the gay son-in-law of then-president of Mexico Porfirio Díaz, Mabel Cadena as Amada Díaz, his illegitimate daughter, and Emiliano Zurita (son of Christian Bach) as Ignacio’s fictional lover, Evaristo Rivas.

Plot
The film is based on the Dance of the Forty-One which was a society scandal in early 20th-century Mexico. The incident revolved around an illegal police raid carried out in 17 November 1901 in a private home in Mexico City. The scandal involved the group of men who attended, 19 of whom were dressed in women's clothing. Despite the government's efforts to hush the incident up, the press was keen to report the incident, since the participants belonged to the upper echelons of society (including the son-in-law of the incumbent President of Mexico). This scandal was unique in that it was the first time homosexuality was openly spoken about in the Mexican media and had a lasting impact on Mexican culture.

Cast
 Alfonso Herrera as Ignacio de la Torre y Mier
 Mabel Cadena as Amada Díaz
 Emiliano Zurita as Evaristo Rivas
 Fernando Becerril as Porfirio Díaz
 Paulina Álvarez Muñoz as Luz Díaz
 Alan Downie as the English butler

Filming locations
The movie was filmed in Mexico City and Guadalajara at the end of 2019. Some filming locations include the Rivas Mercado House, the bar La Opera in Mexico City's historic center and many of the exteriors were filmed in the streets of Guadalajara.

The mansion used to represent the Ignacio de la Torre House is the Casa Rivas Mercado, in Colonia Guerrero, Mexico City, which represents similar eclectic late-19th-century architecture of urban mansions in the area and functions as a cultural center.  The actual Ignacio de la Torre mansion was located where the National Lottery building is now located at Paseo de la Reforma number 1. The Equestrian statue of Charles IV of Spain, better known as "El Caballito", was located in front of the house at that time.

Premiere and distribution
The movie's premiere was on 1 November 2020 at the closing event of the Morelia International Film Festival.

The premiere for the general public was on 19 November 2020 at Cinépolis cinemas in Mexico.

The film premiered on Netflix worldwide on 12 May 2021.

Accolades

References

External links 

 

2020 films
2020 LGBT-related films
Mexican LGBT-related films
LGBT-related drama films
Mexican drama films
LGBT-related films based on actual events
Gay-related films
2020s Mexican films